Behavior change can refer to any transformation or modification of human behavior.

It may also refer to:
Behavior change (public health), a broad range of activities and approaches which focus on the individual, community, and environmental influences on behavior
Behavior change (individual), a rapid and involuntary change of behavior sometimes associated with a mental disorder or a side effect of medication
Behavioral change theories
Behavior change communication
Behavior change methods
Behavioral Change Stairway Model, a law enforcement technique in crisis negotiation

See also
 Behavior modification
 Behavior management
 Behavioral cusp
 Persuasive technology
 Health coaching
 Health action process approach
 Barrier analysis